Caveana is a genus of moths in the family Lecithoceridae. It occurs in Southeast and East Asia.

Species
There are three species:
Caveana diemseoki Park, 2010
Caveana plenalinea Park, 2017
Caveana senuri Park, 2013

References

Torodorinae
Moth genera